The Swiss Ski (before Swiss Ski Association, abbrev. SSV), is the winter sports federation for Switzerland. Part of the International Ski Federation (FIS), it deals with some federations conducting sports for the Winter Olympics, including skiing, biathlon and ski jumping.

Sports 
 Alpine skiing
 Cross-country skiing
 Nordic Combined
 Ski jumping
 Biathlon 
 Snowboarding
 Ski cross
 Freestyle skiing
 Telemark skiing

Organization chart
Swiss Ski is headquartered in Bern Worbstrasse 52, Muri bei Bern, 3074 CH.

Head coahes alpine skiing
Thomas Stauffer (men)
Beat Tschuor (women)

See also
 Switzerland national alpine ski team
 Swiss Alpine Ski Championships

References

External links
 

Switzerland
Winter
Switzerland
Skiing in Switzerland
Sports organizations established in 1904